Suffian is a given name. Notable people with the given name include:

Suffian Awang (born 1971), Malaysian political advisor
Suffian Hakim (born 1986), Singaporean media professional and author
Suffian Rahman (1978–2019), Malaysian footballer

See also
Sufian (disambiguation)